Xonqa (/Хонқа, خانقه) is an urban-type settlement and seat of Xonqa District in Xorazm Region in Uzbekistan. Its population was 28,981 people in 1989, and 39,400 in 2016.

References

Populated places in Xorazm Region
Urban-type settlements in Uzbekistan